Himmat Pura Anand Basti is a historic locality in the surroundings of Charminar.
 It is a 500 year old locality which was established during the reign of the Nizam of Hyderabad.

The biggest landmark in the locality was two storied building Hidayath Manzil & Rashid Manzil that time, during those days only few buildings were erected. Most of the dwellings were Kutcha houses and only few residence were pucca houses.

It has a renowned old mosque, Chamkura Masjid, where residents offer their congregational prayers in large numbers.

References

Maps.google.com.sa
Siasat.com

Buildings and structures in Hyderabad, India